Kirchenpingarten is a municipality in the district of Bayreuth in Bavaria in Germany.

References

Bayreuth (district)